Li Hao (born 6 March 2004) is a Chinese footballer currently playing as a goalkeeper for Spanish side Atlético Madrid.

Club career
Li was selected as one of fifty young Chinese footballers to join the academy of Spanish side Atlético Madrid, as part of Wanda Group's "China Football Hope Star" initiative to encourage the development of young Chinese footballers.

On his return to China, he remained with the Wanda Group, playing for the company's football team, Beijing Wanda. In 2021, he represented the China national under-20 football team in the China League Two, notably producing an impressive performance in the Chinese FA Cup, despite his team losing 2–1 to Dalian Professional.

In February 2023, he returned to Atlético Madrid, joining their academy and becoming the second Chinese player to sign an official contract with the club after Xu Xin.

International career
Li has represented China from under-15 to under-22 level.

Career statistics

Club
.

References

2004 births
Living people
Footballers from Guangzhou
Footballers from Guangdong
Chinese footballers
Association football goalkeepers
China League Two players
Atlético Madrid footballers
Chinese expatriate footballers
Chinese expatriate sportspeople in Spain
Expatriate footballers in Spain
21st-century Chinese people